The Louisiana–Monroe Warhawks women's basketball team is the women's basketball team that represents University of Louisiana at Monroe in Monroe, Louisiana. The team currently competes in the Sun Belt Conference. Brooks Donald-Williams was announced as the ninth head coach in program history by Interim Athletics Director Scott McDonald on April 9, 2019.

History

Coaches

Season-by-season results

NCAA tournament results

References

External links